Kohruyeh (also Romanized as Kohrūyeh; also known as Khurru, Khūrū, Korūyeh, and Kūrū) is a village in Kahruyeh Rural District, in the Central District of Shahreza County, Isfahan Province, Iran. At the 2006 census, its population was 2,310, in 643 families.

References 

Populated places in Shahreza County